Abid Nabi (born 26 December 1985) is an Indian cricketer who plays for Jammu and Kashmir. He is a right-arm fast bowler and is identified as one of the fastest bowlers in India. He also played for the Delhi Giants in the now-defunct Indian Cricket League.

His best bowling analysis is 6 for 91 against Himachal Pradesh in his fourth match. He took 4 for 42 and 5 for 27 in the victory over Kerala in 2009–10.

References

External links
 
An interview with Abid Nabi

1985 births
Living people
Indian cricketers
North Zone cricketers
Jammu and Kashmir cricketers
People from Srinagar
Delhi Giants cricketers